The inverse tangent integral is a special function, defined by:

Equivalently, it can be defined by a power series, or in terms of the dilogarithm, a closely related special function.

Definition
The inverse tangent integral is defined by:

The arctangent is taken to be the principal branch; that is, −/2 < arctan(t) < /2 for all real t.

Its power series representation is

which is absolutely convergent for 

The inverse tangent integral is closely related to the dilogarithm  and can be expressed simply in terms of it:

That is,

for all real x.

Properties
The inverse tangent integral is an odd function:

The values of Ti2(x) and Ti2(1/x) are related by the identity

valid for all x > 0 (or, more generally, for Re(x) > 0).
This can be proven by differentiating and using the identity .

The special value Ti2(1) is Catalan's constant .

Generalizations
Similar to the polylogarithm , the function

is defined analogously. This satisfies the recurrence relation:

Relation to other special functions
The inverse tangent integral is related to the Legendre chi function  by:

The inverse tangent integral can also be written in terms of the Lerch transcendent

History
The notation Ti2 and Tin is due to Lewin. Spence (1809) studied the function, using the notation . The function was also studied by Ramanujan.

References

 
 

Special functions